The Blokart is a popular one-design class of small compact land yacht, manufactured by the New Zealand-based company Blokart International Ltd.

They can be quickly disassembled and packed into a carry-bag giving them a high degree of portability and are designed to be particularly easy to learn to sail. They are used for leisure sailing on beaches in many parts of the world - but Blokart racing is also developing as a competitive international sport, with organised racing including national championships in several countries and a biennial world championship.

History 
The Blokart design was developed in 1999 by Paul Beckett, Tauranga, NZ. The first commercial models made in a purpose built factory were produced in Papamoa, NZ in 2000 and since then the fundamental blokart design has remained virtually unchanged. By 2017, the total number of karts produced exceeded 14,000 with almost half of these sold in Europe.

The basic model, including wheels, mast and sail, weighs only 29 kg and can be dismantled in a few minutes without tools, and all parts packed into a carry-case. The high degree of portability allows them to be transported by car, or carried as luggage on a plane.

Unlike many other land yachts, the Blokart is steered using the hands via a centrally mounted bar directly coupled to the front wheel. This, along with its compact size, makes it highly maneuverable, and able to be used in small urban areas such as carparks or tennis courts.

Wheels can be replaced with ice blades to allow the Blokart to sail on ice - with the first Blokart Ice World Championships staged in Lithuania in 2010.

A side-car accessory or "Shadow" can be added to  carry a passenger, and Blokarts can be joined head-to-tail together using a "Deuce" bar. Multiple can be joined in this way to create long trains.

Blokarts have four standard sail sizes, 2.0m, 3.0m, 4.0m and 5.5m, with sail size choice being dependent on wind strength and weight of the sailor. Heavier sailors require larger sails, and smaller sails are more efficient in stronger winds.

Speeds of more than 100 km/hr have been attained on land and up to 130 km/hr on ice. The current Blokart land speed record of 125 km/hr (77.7 mph) was set by Scott Young and Dave Lussier at Lake Ivanpah in Eastern California on Wednesday, 11 April 2018. The record was set on the 2nd lap of the final race of the 2018 North Americans when a Haboob (desert wind storm) came across the racing area.

Adventure

In 2007 a group of 11 international adventurers crossed the Gobi Desert on Blokarts in a journey planned by French enthusiast Chrisophe Gombert of France, and Mongol guide and friend Batzorig.

Racing

Although Blokarts meet the qualification standard for mini-yachts under the FISLY regulations, they are generally sailed in separate regattas organised under the IBRA rules. The "one design" standard has helped Blokart racing  spread rapidly throughout the world - with national and regional championships now being contested annually in numerous countries including: USA, Australia, NZ, Britain, Spain, Belgium, France, Denmark, Sweden, Germany, Lithuania and the Netherlands.

Blokart World Championships have been held biennially since 2008 as follows;

† The 2020 Blokart World Championships scheduled for Manawatu, New Zealand were postponed due to the covid-19 pandemic. They are currently rescheduled for October 2022, subject to the lifting of travel restriction.

Blokart Racing
is administered by the International Blokart Racing Association (IBRA) who sanction events and set the international racing rules.

Setup

Racing differs to other land yacht racing - which typically has stationary starts and race across the wind on beaches. It actually has more in common with water based sailing, with 2-3 minute dial-up starts and windward/leeward courses. Racing is held on purpose built tracks, airport runways, parking areas as well as beaches and dry lake beds. Races are between 5 minutes and 8 minutes in duration.

The hand steering allows people with lower-limb disabilities to compete with able-bodied pilots.

Sail selection for racing is dependent on pilot weight and the sailing course. Heavier pilots require larger sails; tighter courses generally require a larger sail - and for straighter and more open courses a smaller sail provides less drag and therefore greater maximum speed.

Classifications

Blokarts are raced in two classes – production and performance. The production class is based on the basic design; while in the performance class additional parts from the manufacturer are allowed such as carbon fibre mast sections and an aerodynamic shell, adjustable downhaul and modification of the sail battens to alter the shape of the sail. New components must sanctioned by IBRA before they can be used in racing.

Depending on number of entries at events, Blokart classes are further broken down into weight divisions determined by the body-weight of the racer. For the Blokart world championships the 4 following divisions have been defined:
 Lightweight Division: Less than 70 kg
 Middleweight: From 70 kg to less than 82.5 kg
 Heavyweight: From 82.5 kg to less than 95 kg
 Super Heavyweight: 95 kg and greater

There is generally no differentiation of racers on the basis of age or gender.

Locations

Blokarting can be done on virtually any open area larger than the size of a tennis court.
Beaches provide an ideal venue subject to tides, wind direction and density of people.

Some of the most well used areas for Blokarting are listed below.

New Zealand
Ninety Mile Beach and Tokerau Beaches, in the far north
 Glinks Gully and Bailey's Beach.
 Ruakaka and Forestry Beach
 Muriwai, Karioitahi, Orewa and other beaches in Auckland
 Ardmore Airport  - home of the Auckland Blokart Club.
 BayStation - a purpose built Blokart track in Mount Maunganui
 Ohakea Airforce Base
 Foxton Beach and the Sanson Track in the Manawatu
 Waitere & Waikanae Beaches near Wellington
 Higgins Blokart Park, Napier
Vortex Wind Karting Track and Rabbit Island near Nelson
 GreenPark Sands (Lake Ellesmere just outside of Christchurch) - a dry lake bed usually available Nov-March
 Pegasus Bay Christchurch - 19k's of beach sailing from the "Spit" to the Waimakariri River & Pines Beach to the Ashley River
 Velocity Karts - a purpose built track in Christchurch
 Wigram Airfield - home of the Canterbury Blokart Club
 Oreti Beach near Invercargill

Australia
 Lake Lefroy, Lake Walyungup and Caron Dam Bitumen (Perenjori) in Western Australia
 Lake Gillies and Kingston SE in South Australia
 Mulambin Beach and Farnborough Beach in Yeppoon. Bucasia Beach and Cape Hillsborough at Mackay in Queensland.
 Wangaratta - HQ for the North East Windsport Club @ -36.179696, 146.461640 
 Casey Fields Cranbourne, VIC 3977: GPS Coordinates -38.121525, 145.307615 160 Berwick Cranbourne Road Cranbourne East 3977 - home of Victorian Blokart Club
 Olivers Lake and Beaches in Gippsland, Victoria.

United States
 Ivanpah Lake near Las Vegas
 Red Lake (Arizona – New Mexico)
 New Jersey Beaches - Brigantine, Wildwood ( off season)
 Musselman Honda Circuit Arizona

Europe
 Blokart CPH, Amager Strandpark, Copenhagen, Denmark
 Rømø Island, Denmark
 IJmuiden beach near Amsterdam, Netherlands
 Nida, Lithuania
 Ostend and Zeedijk Beaches in Belgium
 LandSailing BCN, Barcelona, Spain
 Zaragoza, Spain
 Land Sailing Tarifa, Spain
 Son Vent blokart track, Binissalem, Mallorca, Spain
 Villaumbrales Blokart Racing, Palencia, Spain
 Asociación Madrileña Blokart, Villanueva de la Cañada (Madrid), Spain
 Saint Pierre Quiberon (Blokart Center), Saint Malo, France
 La Franqui beach, Berck sur mer (Eole club) France
 blokart - LandSailing Austria - Vienna

United Kingdom
 Map of UK Blokart sailing venues
 Cefn Sidan Beach in Wales
 Weston Super Mare in Somerset
 Finmere Aerodrome, just outside Buckingham

Clubs 

Australia:

Queensland:

 South East Queensland Blokart Club
 Central Queensland Blokart Club
Capricornia Blokart Club http://www.sandyachting.info

New South Wales:

Hunter Valley Blokart Club
NSW Blokart Club 

Victoria:

Victorian Blokart Club
 Melbourne Blokart Club
Wangaratta, Victoria - North East Windsport Club, http://www.newc.com.au/  

Western Australia:
 Perth Blokart Club 

South Australia:
 South Australian Blokart Club

New Zealand:

 Auckland Blokart Club
 Bay Blokart Club
 Hawkes Bay Blokart Club
 Canterbury Blokart Club
 Manuwatu Blokart Club
 Top Of The South (Nelson) Blokart Club

Spain:

 La Asociación Española de Blokart – Spanish Blokart Association – links to Spanish clubs
 Asociación Española de Carrovelismo - Spanish Landsailing Association

United Kingdom:

 The BLSA

United States:

 North American Blokart Sailing Association

See also
 Ice yachting
 Kite buggying
 Kite landboarding
 Land windsurfing
 Whike sailing cycle
 Wind-powered land vehicle

References

External links

 European Blokart Association - The governing body for blokart racing in Europe
 NABSA (USA) - the North American Blokart Sailing Association
 New Zealand Blokart Association - The governing body for blokart racing in NZ
 Australia Blokart Association - The governing body for blokart racing in Australia
 The BLSA - UK governing body for Blokart Sailing and Land Speedsailing
 Blokart International Ltd - the developer and manufacturer of blokarts
 SeaBreeze Blokart Forum - "Australian Land Sailing Forum" section for Blokarts.
 Bay Station - The location of a track and blokarts for hire in the Bay of Plenty, NZ.
 Blokartersuk.com (UK)
 https://www.facebook.com/groups/t.i.shredders/

Sailing
New Zealand design